Theodore Dikanda (born 2 June 1966) is a Swedish wrestler. He competed in the men's freestyle 62 kg at the 1988 Summer Olympics.

References

External links
 

1966 births
Living people
Swedish male sport wrestlers
Olympic wrestlers of Sweden
Wrestlers at the 1988 Summer Olympics
People from Lidköping Municipality
Sportspeople from Västra Götaland County